The rough coffee snake (Nothopsis rugosus) is a snake found in Central America, western Colombia, and western Ecuador.

References 

Dipsadinae
Reptiles described in 1871
Reptiles of Colombia
Reptiles of Ecuador
Taxa named by Edward Drinker Cope